Antonio Sivera Salvá (born 11 August 1996) is a Spanish professional footballer who plays for Deportivo Alavés as a goalkeeper.

Club career

Valencia
Born in Xàbia, Alicante, Valencian Community, Sivera joined Valencia CF's youth setup in 2013 after stints at CD Jávea, Alicante CF and Hércules CF. He made his senior debut on 10 November 2013 at the age of 17, starting for the reserves in a 3–1 Segunda División B away loss against Elche CF Ilicitano.

Sivera signed a five-year professional contract with Valencia on 10 February 2015, and was definitely promoted to the B team in May. After spending the 2015–16 season as a backup to Álex Sánchez, he became a regular starter in the following as they reached the promotion play-offs.

Alavés
On 19 July 2017, Sivera joined La Liga club Deportivo Alavés on a four-year deal. He made his professional debut on 24 October, in a 1–0 away win over Getafe CF in the fourth round of the Copa del Rey.

Sivera's first match in the league took place on 29 April 2018, when he started and was replaced by habitual starter Fernando Pacheco shortly after the hour mark of the 0–1 home loss to Atlético Madrid. On 13 January 2020, he moved to Segunda División side UD Almería on loan until the end of the season.

International career
Sivera won his first cap for Spain at under-21 level on 1 September 2017, in a 3–0 friendly defeat of Italy held in Toledo. In 2019, he was the starter as the team won the UEFA European Championship for the fifth time.

Career statistics

Club

Honours
Spain U19
UEFA European Under-19 Championship: 2015

Spain U21
UEFA European Under-21 Championship: 2019

References

External links

Stats and bio at Ciberche 

1996 births
Living people
People from Xàbia
Sportspeople from the Province of Alicante
Spanish footballers
Footballers from the Valencian Community
Association football goalkeepers
La Liga players
Segunda División players
Segunda División B players
Valencia CF Mestalla footballers
Deportivo Alavés players
UD Almería players
Spain youth international footballers
Spain under-21 international footballers